Calvin Woodrow Ruck  (September 4, 1925 – October 19, 2004) was a human rights activist and a member of the Senate of Canada. He was born in Sydney, Nova Scotia; his parents were immigrants to Canada from Barbados.

Ruck's life has been documented in a book entitled Winds of Change: Life and Legacy of Calvin W. Ruck, which was penned by his granddaughter, Lindsay Ruck.

Associations and activism
He held a number of positions within the Nova Scotia Association for the Advancement of Coloured People and was a member for most of his adult life. In the 1950s and 1960s, he organized campaigns against businesses in the Dartmouth area, including barber shops, which refused to serve black people. He worked with the Nova Scotia Human Rights Commission from 1981 to 1986. He campaigned tirelessly for the Canadian Government to recognize the heroics of Jeremiah Jones during the Battle of Vimy Ridge.

Awards
1979: Received diploma from the Maritime School of Social Work at Dalhousie University. The School of Social Work now awards a Calvin W. Ruck scholarship yearly.
1992: Awarded the Governor General's Commemorative Medal in 1992 for his work in the community.
1994: Named to the Order of Canada.

Political life
In 1998, he was appointed to the Senate of Canada by Prime Minister Jean Chrétien, where he served until reaching the mandatory retirement age of 75 in 2000.

He died at his home in Ottawa on October 19, 2004 at the age of 79.

Books published
Ruck published two books about Canada's No. 2 Construction Battalion, the only all-black battalion to serve in World War I:
 Canada's Black Battalion: No. 2 Construction, 1916-1920
 The Black Battalion : 1916-1920 : Canada's best kept military secret

See also 
Black Nova Scotians

Notes

External links
 

1925 births
2004 deaths
Liberal Party of Canada senators
Members of the Order of Canada
Canadian senators from Nova Scotia
Dalhousie University alumni
Canadian civil rights activists
Canadian military historians
Canadian male non-fiction writers
Canadian people of Barbadian descent
Black Nova Scotians
Black Canadian politicians
People from Sydney, Nova Scotia
Writers from Nova Scotia
Black Canadian activists